Small world, Small worlds, or Smallworld may refer to:

Books
Small World (Beaumont novel), a 2008 novel by Matt Beaumont
Small World (King novel), a 1981 horror novel by Tabitha King
Small World: An Academic Romance, a 1984 comic novel by David Lodge
small worlds, a play by Eva Maler

Film and television

Film
Small World (2010 film), a 2010 Franco-German drama film
Small World (2003 film), a 2003 Serbian comedy film

TV
Small World (UK TV series), a miniseries based on the David Lodge novel
Small World , a talk show hosted by Edward R. Murrow
Small World (U.S. TV series), an animated anthology show on Cartoon Network
"Small World", an episode in season 5 of Sons of Anarchy
"Small Worlds" (Torchwood), a 2006 episode of Torchwood
Smallworld Cable, a Scottish cable television and broadband provider

Music

Albums
Small World (Gábor Szabó album), 1972
Small World (Huey Lewis and the News album) or the title song, 1988
Small World (Metronomy album), 2022
Small World, by Gracenote, 2020

Songs
"Small World", from the musical Gypsy, 1959
"Small World", by Idina Menzel from Idina, 2016
"Small World", by Sabina Ddumba, 2018
"Small Worlds", by Mac Miller from Swimming, 2018

Computing, science, and technology 
Smallworld, a Geographic Information System targeted to utilities from General Electric
SmallWorlds, a 3D virtual world
aSmallWorld, an internet network
Small-world experiment, a series of social network experiments conducted by Stanley Milgram
Small-world network, a generalization of the small world phenomenon to non-social networks
Small-world routing, routing methods for small-world networks

Other
Small Worlds (presentation), a presentation by Raph Koster about MMORPG conventions
"It's a Small World", a 1964 ride at several Disney parks, commonly known as Small World
Small World (board game), a board game by Days of Wonder

See also 
It's a Small World (disambiguation)